Rodeo Strip was a monthly comics magazine published in Turkey between October 2004 - May 2006. The magazine is known as the longest living effort in 21st century Turkey's authentic comics publications.

History and profile
Rodeo Strip was first published in 2004. The magazine was created and edited by Murat Mihcioglu, who also scripted some of the content. The published was Promat. The magazine was based in Istanbul.

Turkish comic creators including Mahmud Asrar, Yıldıray Çınar, Cem Özüduru, Yalcin Didman, Ersin Burak, Murat Bozkurt, Yasemin Ezberci, Murat Kalkavan and Caner Atakul were active in the magazine. Yalcin Didman and Cem Özüduru went on to work with the magazine to create graphic novels.

Some Bonelli comics like Dylan Dog and Brendon also appeared in the pages of Rodeo Strip.

References

2004 establishments in Turkey
2006 disestablishments in Turkey
Defunct magazines published in Turkey
Humor magazines
Magazines about comics
Magazines established in 2004
Magazines disestablished in 2006
Magazines published in Istanbul
Turkish-language magazines
Monthly magazines published in Turkey
Satirical magazines published in Turkey